Short order cooking, in the restaurant business, is the preparation of foods that are quick to cook.  Many small restaurants serve only short-order items, which include fried, broiled, griddled foods, as well as assembled foods like sandwiches. Short order cooking is common at greasy spoon and diner restaurants.

A cook responsible for short order cooking is a short order cook. The U.S. Bureau of Labor Statistics defines the role of short order cooks as those who, "Prepare and cook to order a variety of foods that require only a short preparation time. May take orders from customers and serve patrons at counters or tables," and it specifically excludes fast food cooks. As of May 2019, the U.S. Bureau of Labor Statistics estimates there were more than 150,000 short order cooks in the United States.

Notes

Cooking
Restaurant terminology